Samuel Jackson Snead (pronounced sni:d; May 27, 1912 – May 23, 2002) was an American professional golfer who was one of the top players in the world for the better part of four decades (having won PGA of America and Senior PGA Tour events over six decades) and widely regarded as one of the greatest players of all time. Snead was awarded a record 94 gold medallions, for wins in PGA of America (referred to by most as the PGA) Tour events and later credited with winning a record 82 PGA Tour events tied with Tiger Woods, including seven majors. He never won the U.S. Open, though he was runner-up four times. Snead was inducted into the World Golf Hall of Fame in 1974.

Snead's nicknames included "The Slammer", "Slammin' Sammy Snead", and "The Long Ball Hitter from West Virginia", and he was admired by many for having a "perfect swing", which generated many imitators. Snead was famed for his folksy image, wearing a straw hat, and making such statements as "Keep close count of your nickels and dimes, stay away from whiskey, and never concede a putt." and "There are no short hitters on the tour anymore, just long and unbelievably long." Fellow West Virginia Golf Hall of Fame Inductee Bill Campbell has said of Snead, "He was the best natural player ever. He had the eye of an eagle, the grace of a leopard and the strength of a lion." Gary Player once said that, "I don't think there's any question in my mind that Sam Snead had the greatest golf swing of any human being that ever lived." Jack Nicklaus said that Snead's swing was "so perfect."

Awards
Snead was the PGA leading money winner in 1938, 1949 and 1950. He won the Vardon Trophy, for lowest scoring average, four times: 1938, 1949, 1950, and 1955. In 1949, he was PGA Golfer of the Year.

Snead was inducted into the Virginia Sports Hall of Fame in 1973. In 1986, Snead was inducted into the Middle Atlantic PGA Hall of Fame. Snead was also inducted into the PGA of America Hall of Fame and the Helms Hall of Fame. Snead received the PGA Tour Lifetime Achievement Award in 1998. In 2009, Snead was inducted into the inaugural class of the West Virginia Golf Hall of Fame and in 2016, Snead was the unanimous top choice for inclusion in the Virginia Golf Hall of Fame's inaugural class.

Personal life
Born in Ashwood, Virginia, near Hot Springs, Snead began caddying at age seven at The Homestead's Old Course in Hot Springs. He worked as an assistant pro at The Homestead at 17 in 1929, then moved to the Cascades Course and turned professional in 1934. During the depression, Snead taught himself the game of golf from a set of clubs carved from tree limbs. Snead joined the PGA Tour in 1936, and achieved immediate success by winning the West Virginia Closed Pro tournament.

In 1936 he won two matches at the Meadow Brook Club, earning a $10,000 prize. This gave him the money he needed to start playing professionally full-time. In 1944 he became resident playing professional at The Greenbrier Resort in White Sulphur Springs, West Virginia, and maintained ties to Hot Springs and The Homestead all of his life. During the winter, he was resident playing pro at the Boca Raton Resort from 1956 to 1969. Each spring he returned to the Mid-Atlantic, stopping at The Masters Tournament on his way back to The Greenbrier.

Snead served in the U.S. Navy during World War II from 1942 to 1944. He was an athletic specialist in Cmdr. Gene Tunney's program in San Diego, and was given a medical discharge for a back injury in September 1944.

Snead appeared as himself in an episode of The Phil Silvers Show, "The Colonel Breaks Par", in 1957.

His nephew, J. C. Snead, was also a successful professional golfer, winning tournaments on both the PGA Tour and the Champions Tour.

Career
In July 1936, Snead won his first tournament, the West Virginia Closed Pro, contested at The Greenbrier's Championship Course and Old White Course. He shot rounds of 70–61 to rout Logan, West Virginia professional, Clem Wiechman by 16 strokes (74-73). The following month, he won the first of 17 West Virginia Open championships by beating Art Clark by five strokes at Guyan Country Club in Huntington, West Virginia.

In 1937, Snead's first full year on the PGA Tour, he won six events, including the Oakland Open at Claremont Country Club in California and his second West Virginia Open. In Snead's debut in the U.S. Open hosted at Oakland Hills, he finishes runner-up to Ralph Guldahl (who won with 19 clubs in his bag). Snead shared the first round lead shooting 69 with fellow West Virginian Denny Shute (1936 and 1937 PGA Champion). In Snead's first of two attempts in The Open Championship, he finished tied for 11th. While working at The Greenbrier, Snead played in the U.S. Pro Tennis Championships. In the first round, he faced eventual winner Karel Kozeluh, losing to Kozeluh by scores of 6–1, 6–1, and 6–1.

In 1938, Snead first won the Greater Greensboro Open, the first of eight times, the Tour record for victories of a single tournament event. Snead introduced his first book, Sam Snead's quick way to better golf.

In 1939, Snead won three times. 1939 was the first of four times (although Snead had already come close in 1937, losing to the eventual champion who had 19 clubs in his bag) where Snead failed at crucial moments of the U.S. Open, the only major event he never won. Needing par to win at the Philadelphia C.C., but not knowing that, since on-course scoreboards did not exist at that time, Snead posted a triple-bogey 8 on the par-5 72nd hole, taking a risky shot from a difficult lie in the fairway. Snead had been told on the 18th tee by a spectator that he needed a birdie to win. Snead ended up in fifth place, two shots behind three players who went into a playoff.

During World War II, Snead was prevented from participating in 14 major championships (1940–1945 Open Championship, 1942–1945 U.S. Open, 1943–1945 Masters, 1943 PGA Championship), due to their cancellations. Snead served in the U.S. Navy from 1942 to 1944.

In 1946, Snead won six times including the Open Championship at St Andrews. His expenses for playing there were more than three times his winning purse. Snead tied for sixth in the Open in 1962. Snead introduced the book, Sam Snead's How to play golf, and professional tips on improving your score. Also, rules of the game of golf, as approved by the United States Golf Association, and by the Royal and ancient golf club of St. Andrews.

At the U.S. Open in 1947, Snead missed a  putt on the final playoff hole to finish runner-up to Lew Worsham.

Snead won three times in 1948, including his first Texas Open and fourth West Virginia Open.

In 1949, Snead won nine PGA events including two majors including the Masters and the PGA Championship and was awarded Golfer of the Year. For Snead, it was the third of four second-place finishes at the U.S. Open, the only major championship he never won. Needing two pars to finish in a tie for the lead, Snead took three shots to hole out his ball from the fringe of the green on the 17th hole.

In 1950, Snead won 11 events, placing him third in that category behind Byron Nelson (18, in 1945) and Ben Hogan (13, in 1946). Snead claimed that 1950 was his "greatest year" winning "eleven tournaments" including a playoff victory over Hogan in the L.A. Open yet lost the "Golfer of the Year" to Hogan, who won one "tournament". His scoring average of 69.23 was a Vardon Trophy record that stood for 50 years.

In 1952, Snead won ten events including the Masters. At the Jacksonville Open, Snead forfeited rather than play an 18-hole playoff against Doug Ford after the two golfers finished in a tie at the end of regulation play. The forfeit stemmed from a ruling Snead received during the tournament's second round of play. On the 10th hole, Snead's drive landed behind an out-of-bounds stake. While Chick Harbert, who was playing with Snead, thought the ball was out of bounds, a rules official ruled differently due to the starter not telling players the stakes had been moved after the previous day's play had ended. Afterwards, Snead explained why he forfeited even though Ford suggested they play sudden death for the title. "I want to be fair about it. I don't want anyone to think I took advantage of the ruling." Snead set the record for most PGA wins after reaching age 40, with 17.

In 1953, Snead won three events. He finished runner-up to Ben Hogan at the U.S. Open (the fourth time he would finish runner-up at the U.S. Open).

In 1954, Snead won two events, one of which was the Masters in an 18-hole playoff over Ben Hogan.

In December 1959, Snead took part in a controversial match against Mason Rudolph, at the Mid Ocean Club in Bermuda. Snead decided to deliberately lose the televised match, played under the "World Championship Golf" series, during its final holes, after he discovered on the 12th hole that he had too many golf clubs in his bag. (A player is limited to 14 clubs during competitive rounds.) The match was tied at that stage. The extra club in his bag, a fairway wood Snead had been experimenting with in practice, would have caused him to be immediately disqualified according to the Rules of Golf, even though he did not use it during the round. After the match was over, Snead explained the matter, and said he did not disqualify himself in order not to spoil the show. The problem did not become known outside a small circle until the show was televised four months later. After the incident came to light, the sponsor cancelled further participation in the series.

Beginning in 1960, Snead hosted television's Celebrity Golf program, emceed by Harry von Zell, competing for charity in nine-hole contests against Hollywood celebrities like Dean Martin, Jerry Lewis and Bob Hope. Snead had appeared with Martin and Lewis in their 1953 comedy film, The Caddy.

On February 7, 1962, at age 49, Snead won the Royal Poinciana Plaza Invitational, an LPGA Tour "Battle of the Sexes" tournament where he faced off against 14 LPGA pros.  The low woman was Mickey Wright, herself Snead's equivalent in women's golf, with the most wins on that tour.

His 1962 autobiography was titled The Education of a Golfer. Snead later wrote several golf instructional books, and frequently wrote instructional columns in golf magazines.

In 1965, Snead became the oldest player (52 years, 10 months and 8 days) to win on the PGA Tour (the Greater Greensboro Open).

Snead played on seven Ryder Cup teams: 1937, 1947, 1949, 1951, 1953, 1955, and 1959. Snead was selected to the 1939 Ryder Cup team however the event was never played due to World War II. He captained the team in 1951, 1959, and 1969.

In 1971, he won the PGA Club Professional Championship at Pinehurst Resort.

In 1973, Snead became the oldest player to make a cut in a U.S. Open at age 61.

In 1974, at age 61, he shot a third-round 66 at the Los Angeles Open at Riviera Country Club to move into contention.  A birdie at #17 in the last round moved him to within one stroke of the lead. Dave Stockton hit a miraculous fairway wood on the final hole. Snead was joint runner-up.

He shot a final-round 68 at the 1974 PGA Championship to finish tied for third, three strokes behind winner Lee Trevino. At age 62, it was Snead's third consecutive top-10 finish at the PGA Championship, but his last time in contention at a major.

In 1978, he won the first Legends of Golf event, which was the impetus for the creation, two years later, of the Senior PGA Tour, now the Champions Tour.

In 1979, he was the youngest PGA Tour golfer to shoot his age (67) in the second round of the 1979 Quad Cities Open. He shot under his age (66) in the final round.

In 1982, he teamed with Don January to shoot 27-under-par to win the rain-shortened 54-hole Liberty Mutual Legends of Golf event at Onion Creek Club "The Birthplace of the Senior PGA Tour" in Austin, Texas. This victory would mark victories for Snead that spanned over six decades (1930s–1980s) winning tour and senior tour events.

In 1983, at age 71, he shot a round of 60 (12-under-par) at The Homestead in Hot Springs, Virginia.

In 1986, Snead wrote the book, Pigeons, Marks, Hustlers and Other Golf Bettors You Can Beat.

In 1997, at age 85, he shot a round of 78 at the Old White course of The Greenbrier in White Sulphur Springs, West Virginia.

In 1998, he received the PGA Tour Lifetime Achievement Award, the fourth person to be so honored.

From 1984 to 2002, he hit the honorary starting tee shot at the Masters Tournament. Until 1999, he was joined by Gene Sarazen, and until 2001, by Byron Nelson.

In 2000, Snead was ranked the third greatest golfer of all time, in Golf Digest magazine's rankings, behind only Jack Nicklaus and Ben Hogan.

Death

Snead died in Hot Springs, Virginia in 2002 following complications from a stroke, four days before his 90th birthday. He was survived by two sons: Sam Jr. of Hot Springs, and Terry, of Mountain Grove, Virginia, and a brother, Pete, of Pittsburgh, as well as two grandchildren. His wife Audrey died in 1990. His nephew J. C. Snead was also a PGA Tour golfer.

In popular culture
Snead was mentioned several times in the comic strip Peanuts at the height of his popularity during the 1950s and 1960s. As its creator and avid golfer Charles M. Schulz said in a 1971 interview: "I was a great admirer of Sam Snead. I once watched him play a round in the St. Paul tournament when he hit every green in regulation figures – and all the par fives in two – for a truly flawless round."

Playing style
During his peak years, Snead was an exceptionally long driver, particularly into the wind, with very good accuracy as well. He was a superb player with the long irons. Snead was also known for a very creative short game, pioneering use of the sand wedge for short shots from grass. As he aged, he began to experiment with different putting styles. Snead pioneered croquet-style putting in the 1960s, where he straddled the ball with one leg on each side. The United States Golf Association banned this technique in 1968 by amending the old Rule 35–1, since, until that time, golfers had always faced the ball when striking. Snead then went to side-saddle putting, where he crouched and angled his feet towards the hole, and held the club with a split grip. He used that style for the rest of his career.

Records
Snead holds the following records:

 Most PGA Tour victories: 82
 Most PGA sanctioned tour victories: 94
 Became the first player to win 17 times at an event: at the West Virginia Open (1936–1938, 1948, 1949, 1952, 1957, 1958, 1960, 1961, 1966–1968, 1970–1973)
 First player to win an event in six different decades (1930s–1980s).
 Became the first player to win 8 times at an event: at the Greater Greensboro Open (1938, 1946, 1949, 1950, 1955, 1956, 1960, 1965)
 First player to be credited with winning a PGA Tour event in four different decades.
 Oldest player to be credited with winning a PGA Tour event: age 52 years, 10 months, 8 days at the 1965 Greater Greensboro Open
 Oldest player to make the cut at a major: age 67 years, 2 months, 7 days at the 1979 PGA Championship
 First PGA Tour player to shoot his age: 67 in the second round of the 1979 Quad Cities Open
 Oldest player to make a cut on the PGA Tour: age 67 years, 2 months, 21 days at the 1979 Manufacturers Hanover Westchester Classic.
 Only player to post a top-10 finish in at least one major championship in five different decades.
 Became the first player to win PGA and Senior PGA Tour events over six decades (1930s–1980s)

Sources:

Professional wins (142)

PGA Tour wins (82)

*Note: Tournament shortened to 18/54 holes due to weather.

PGA Tour playoff record (12–6)

Sources:

LPGA Tour wins (1)

Other wins (45)
1936 West Virginia Open
1937 West Virginia Open
1938 West Virginia Open
1940 Ontario Open (Canada)
1941 Center Open (Argentina)
1941 St Augustine Pro-am (with Wilford Wehrle)
1942 St Augustine Pro-am (with Wilford Wehrle)
1948 West Virginia Open, Havana Invitational
1949 North and South Open, West Virginia Open, National Celebrities Open 
1951 Greenbrier Pro-Am 
1952 West Virginia Open, Brazil Open, Greenbrier Pro-Am, Julius Boros Open, Seminole Pro-am
1953 Greenbrier Pro-Am, Orlando International Mixed Best Ball (with Betty MacKinnon)
1954 Panama Open
1955 McNaughtons Pro-am 
1956 Canada Cup (with Ben Hogan), Boca Raton Open
1957 West Virginia Open
1958 West Virginia Open, Greenbrier Invitational
1959 Sam Snead Festival, Eldorado Professional (tied with Doug Ford)
1960 West Virginia Open, Canada Cup (with Arnold Palmer)
1961 West Virginia Open, Sam Snead Festival, Canada Cup (with Jimmy Demaret), Canada Cup – International Trophy
1962 Canada Cup (with Arnold Palmer) 
1964 Haig & Haig Scotch Foursome (with Shirley Englehorn)
1966 West Virginia Open
1967 West Virginia Open
1968 West Virginia Open
1970 West Virginia Open
1971 PGA Club Professional Championship, West Virginia Open
1972 West Virginia Open
1973 West Virginia Open

Note: this list is incomplete.

Senior wins (14)
1964 PGA Seniors' Championship, World Senior Championship
1965 PGA Seniors' Championship, World Senior Championship
1967 PGA Seniors' Championship
1970 PGA Seniors' Championship, World Senior Championship
1972 PGA Seniors' Championship, World Senior Championship
1973 PGA Seniors' Championship, World Senior Championship
1978 Legends of Golf (with Gardner Dickinson)
1980 Golf Digest Commemorative Pro-Am
1982 Liberty Mutual Legends of Golf (with Don January)

Major championships

Wins (7)

Note: The PGA Championship was match play until 1958.1Defeated Ben Hogan in 18-hole playoff – Snead 70 (−2), Hogan 71 (−1).

Results timeline

NT = no tournament
WD = withdrew
CUT = missed the half-way cut
"T" indicates a tie for a place
R64, R32, R16, QF, SF = Round in which player lost in PGA Championship match play

Summary

Most consecutive cuts made – 55 (1937 Masters – 1958 Masters)
Longest streak of top-10s – 6 (1948 U.S. Open – 1950 Masters)

U.S. national team appearances
Professional
Ryder Cup: 1937 (winners), 1947 (winners), 1949 (winners), 1951 (winners, playing captain), 1953 (winners), 1955 (winners), 1959 (winners, playing captain), 1969 (tied, non-playing captain)
Canada Cup: 1954, 1956 (winners), 1957, 1958, 1959, 1960 (winners), 1961 (winners, individual winner), 1962 (winners)

See also

List of golfers with most PGA Tour wins
List of golfers with most wins in one PGA Tour event
List of men's major championships winning golfers
Most PGA Tour wins in a year

References

External links

Photos of Sam Snead at Palm Beach Golf Classic

American male golfers
PGA Tour golfers
PGA Tour Champions golfers
Winners of men's major golf championships
Ryder Cup competitors for the United States
World Golf Hall of Fame inductees
Golf writers and broadcasters
Golfers from Virginia
The Greenbrier people
United States Navy personnel of World War II
People from Bath County, Virginia
People from Hot Springs, Virginia
1912 births
2002 deaths